Ball Arena–Elitch Gardens (sometimes stylized as Ball Arena•Elitch Gardens) is an at-grade light rail station on the E Line and W Line of the RTD Rail system. It is located near the intersection of 9th Street and Chopper Circle in Denver, Colorado, near Ball Arena and Elitch Gardens Theme Park, after which the station is named.

The station opened on April 5, 2002, as part of the Regional Transportation District's (RTD) Central Platte Valley Light Rail Line project.

The station was previously known as Pepsi Center–Six Flags Elitch Gardens. The basketball arena was renamed in 2020 and Six Flags sold Elitch Gardens in 2007.

References

RTD light rail stations in Denver
Railway stations in the United States opened in 2002
2002 establishments in Colorado
W Line (RTD)